Darmon may refer to:

 Gérard Darmon (born in 1948), French-Moroccan movie actor and singer
 Henri Darmon (born in 1965), French Canadian mathematician specializing in number theory
 Jean-Charles Darmon (born in 1961), French literary critic
 Pierre Darmon (born in 1934),  former French tennis player, husband of Rosa Maria Darmon
Ron Darmon (born in 1992), Israeli Olympic triathlete
 Rosa Maria Reyes Darmon (born in 1939), former French tennis player, wife of Pierre Darmon